Undaya (The Bullet) is a 2000 Sri Lankan Sinhala drama thriller film directed and produced by K. A. W. Perera. It stars Sangeetha Weeraratne and Priyankara Perera in lead roles along with Sathischandra Edirisinghe and Channa Perera. Music composed by Shelton Premaratne. It is the 930th Sri Lankan film in the Sinhala cinema.

The film was previewed and allowed by the Public Performances Board (PPB) in July 1993, however had to wait until 2000 to release the film in theaters.

Plot

Cast
 Sangeetha Weeraratne as Sarala Paliwardhana
 Sathischandra Edirisinghe as Ranil Seneviratne
 Priyankara Perera as Jayadeva 'Deva' Seneviratne
 Channa Perera as Murthi Paliwardhana
 Lionel Deraniyagala as Seram
 Rathna Sumanapala as Sarala's mother
 Edna Sugathapala as Beatrice 'Aunty'
 Nimal Wickramaarachchi as Manis 'Mama'
 Hyacinth Wijeratne as Deva's mother
 Lal Senadeera as Constable Silva
 Jayarathna Rupasinghe as Thief chasing constable
 Kapila Sigera as Ranil's henchman

References

2000 films
2000s Sinhala-language films
2000 thriller drama films
Sri Lankan thriller drama films
2000 drama films